Runtastic GmbH is a digital health and fitness company from Austria.

On 5 August 2015, Adidas bought Runtastic for €220 million ($240 million).

On 25 September 2019, the Runtastic channels were rebranded to Adidas Runtastic.

History
The initial idea was born during a project at the University of Applied Sciences Upper Austria for tracking sailboat races.

The company was founded in 2009 by Florian Gschwandtner, Christian Kaar, René Giretzlehner, and Alfred Luger in Pasching, Upper Austria.

In August 2015, it was announced that Adidas had acquired Runtastic for €220 million ($240 million), this included the 50.1% stake Axel Springer bought in the company back in 2013, making Runtastic entirely owned by Adidas.

At the beginning of 2019, Runtastic turned away from its multi-app strategy and focused on developing its two most important apps. These were rebranded in September of the same year. The "Runtastic" app became "Adidas Running", and the "Results" app became "Adidas Training".

Reception
The broad acceptance of multi-functional mobile devices generally helped reviews of products that make good use of all the extra functionality (e.g. GPS-tracking, audio and video recording and playback, web-syncing, social sharing). This can be seen in reviews of company products, for example from The Verge, TechCrunch, VentureBeat, or The Next Web.

Bibliography
Runtastic and its products have been covered in books and articles, some of which have been listed and commented here (APA 4th Ed.):

Andrea Zajicek. (2011). Social Comm. Norderstedt: BoD. Page 228.
Hubert Beck. (2012). Das große Buch vom Marathon – Lauftraining mit System. München: Stiebner Verlag. Page 307.
Reiner Wichert, & Birgid Eberhardt. (2011). Ambient Assisted Living. Berlin: Springer. Page 287.
Stefan Bölle. (2012). Joggen mit dem Handy: Zur Eignung von Smartphone-Apps als Trainingsbegleiter. München: Grin Verlag. Page 44.
Stephan Verclas, & Claudia Linnhoff-Popien. (2011). Smart Mobile Apps. Berlin: Springer. Page 22.
Tom Rosenkranz. (2012). Marketing im Outernet: Was kommt nach Social Media? München: Grin Verlag. Page 9.

See also
 AllTrails
 Apple Health
 Endomondo
 Google Fit
 MSN Health & Fitness
 Runkeeper
 Strava

References

Adidas
GPS sports tracking applications
Fitness apps
Exercise equipment
Austrian social networking websites
IOS software
WatchOS software
Android (operating system) software
Windows Phone software
2015 mergers and acquisitions
Software companies of Austria
Economy of Upper Austria